The Birthday Party is a 1968 British drama neo noir directed by William Friedkin and starring Robert Shaw. It is based on the 1957 play The Birthday Party by Harold Pinter. The screenplay for the film was written by Pinter as well. The film, and the play, are considered examples of "comedy of menace", a genre associated with Pinter.

The film was a passion project for Friedkin, an admirer of the play, and he remained proud of the film after its release, though it was a box office disappointment.

Plot
A man in his late 30s named Stanley is staying at a seaside boarding house, when he is visited by two menacing and mysterious strangers, Goldberg and McCann. Stanley's neighbour, Lulu, brings a parcel containing a boy's toy drum, which his landlady, Meg, presents to Stanley as his "birthday present."

Goldberg and McCann offer to host Stanley's birthday party after Meg tells them that it is Stanley's birthday, although Stanley protests that it is not his birthday. Through the course of the party, the actions of Goldberg and McCann eventually break down Stanley, and they take him away from the house, purportedly to get medical attention (from "Monty") in their car. Meg's husband Petey (who did not attend the party because he was out playing chess) calls after Stanley: "Stan, don't let them tell you what to do". Meg, still somewhat hung over, is unaware that Stanley has been taken away, since Petey has not told her, and she tells him that she was "the belle of the ball."

Cast

 Robert Shaw as Stanley
 Patrick Magee as McCann
 Dandy Nichols as Meg
 Sydney Tafler as Goldberg
 Moultrie Kelsall as Petey
 Helen Fraser as Lulu

Production
The film was a passion project of director William Friedkin who called it "the first film I really wanted to make, understood and felt passionate about". He had first seen the play in San Francisco in 1962, and managed to gain funding for the film version from Edgar Scherick at Palomar Pictures, in part because it could be made relatively cheaply. Pinter wrote the screenplay himself and was heavily involved in casting. "To this day I don't think our cast could have been improved," wrote Friedkin later.

There was a ten-day rehearsal period and the shoot went smoothly. Friedkin says the only tense exchange he had with Pinter in a year of working together came when Joseph Losey saw the movie and requested through Pinter that Friedkin cut out a mirror shot as it was too close to Losey's style; Friedkin refused as "I wasn't about to destroy the film's continuity to mollify Losey's ego".

Max Rosenberg, best known for his horror movies for Amicus Productions, had been called in by Palomar as line producer.

Critical reception
In his film review, published in The Nation on 6 January 1969, critic Harold Clurman described the film as "a fantasia of fear and prosecution," adding that "Pinter's ear is so keen, his method so economic and so shrewdly stylized, balancing humdrum realistic notations with suggestions of unfathomable violence, that his play succeeds in being both funny and horrific".

The reviewer of the London Evening Standard observed, in a description of the film published on 12 February 1970, that the film, like the play, is "a study of domination that sows doubts, terrors, shuddering illuminations and terrifying apprehensions inside the four walls of a living-room in a seaside boarding-house where Stanley, (Robert Shaw), the lodger, has taken refuge from some guilt, crime, treachery, in fact Some Thing never named".

Box office
The film earned rentals of $50,000 in North America and $350,000 in other countries. After all costs were deducted, it recorded an overall loss of $725,000.

However, Friedkin later said it was "a film of which I'm proud. The cast played it to perfection. With the exception of an occasional over-the-top directorial flourish I think I captured Pinter's world. The time I spent with him and the many conversations we had were the most invaluable and instructive of my career."

See also
 Harold Pinter bibliography

References

Billington, Michael.  Harold Pinter.  2nd ed.  London: Faber and Faber, 2007.  .  [Updated ed. of The Life and Work of Harold Pinter (London: Faber, 1996).]
Gale, Steven H.  Sharp Cut: Harold Pinter's Screenplays and the Artistic Process.  Lexington: University Press of Kentucky, 2003. .
–––, ed.  The Films of Harold Pinter.  Albany, NY: SUNY Press, 2001.  .   
Friedkin, William, The Friedkin Connection, Harper Collins 2013

External links
"Films by Harold Pinter: The Birthday Party 1967" at HaroldPinter.org – The Official Website of the International Playwright Harold Pinter

 
 

1968 films
1968 drama films
British drama films
1960s English-language films
Films directed by William Friedkin
British films based on plays
Films with screenplays by Harold Pinter
ABC Motion Pictures films
1960s British films